Eesti mõttelugu (Estonian for Story of Estonian thought) is a book series of essay collections by Estonian historical thinkers, published by Ilmamaa since 1994. The editor-in-chief and publisher is Estonian poet Hando Runnel. According to Postimees, Estonia's highest-circulation newspaper, the series has become an institution. As of 2012, 108 volumes had been published. By April 2018, the number of volumes had risen to 139. In 2018, Estonian Academy of Sciences marked its 80th birthday with a conference bearing the same name, focused on the book series, its importance and influence.

References

External links 
 Publisher's official page

Estonian literature
History books about Estonia
Books about Estonia